Filinta is a Turkish detective fiction television drama series created for TRT1 by Yusuf Esenkal and Serdar Öğretici. Filmed in Seka Park Film studio, it is the largest television series set in Turkey. It was located in İzmit (Turkey). It premiered on TRT1 in Turkey on December 23, 2014. It aired until 2016.The spin off comedy series "Zeyrek ile Çeyrek" has Zeyrek and Çeyrek the characters of series Filinta.

 it was one of the most expensive television series in Turkey.

According to The Hollywood Reporter, a source described Filinta as "like a crude Ottoman Downton Abbey".

President of Turkey Recep Tayyip Erdoğan and his wife Emine are known to have visited the production set, congratulating the entire production team.

Cast

| Uğur yildiran - Garbis

See also
Other productions by :
 Payitaht: Abdülhamid
 The Ottoman Lieutenant

References

External links
 
 

2014 Turkish television series debuts
Turkish Radio and Television Corporation original programming
Television series about the Ottoman Empire
Turkish drama television series
Television series produced in Istanbul
Television shows set in Istanbul